The 1890 Northwestern Purple football team was an American football team that represented Northwestern University during the 1890 college football season. The team compiled a 4–1–1 record.  Only two of the seven games were intercollegiate games, a 22–6 victory over Beloit College on November 22, 1890, in Evanston, and a 22–10 victory over Wisconsin on November 27, 1890, in Milwaukee.  The game against Wisconsin was the first between Northwestern and another of the teams that would later organize the Big Ten Conference.

Schedule

References

Northwestern
Northwestern Wildcats football seasons
Northwestern Purple football